Pocket Money Pitch is a short-lived British CBBC children's reality television series, which premiered on 8 February 2016 on a weekly basis. The series consisting of ten episodes airs every Monday during its series duration.

Format
Pocket Money Pitch focuses on various celebrity entrepreneurs viewing children's business ideas, in which the winner will receive a year's worth of pocket money (£322.40). The show's television format is loosely based upon Dragon's Den.

Episodes

Production
The show is presented by BBC Breakfast Business presenter Steph McGovern. Levi Roots, Myleene Klass, Jamal Edwards and Ben Towers are included as three of the other various entrepreneurs.

Broadcast
The show was first broadcast on the CBBC on 8 February 2016 at 5.30pm. From the 8th episode until the end of the series, the show at 5.00pm.

Kiductions.com 
Joe Bloodworth and Phoebe Daltrey started kiductions.com through Pocket Money Pitch. They impressed the guru Jamal Edwards and won the years worth of pocket money. The website was up for a couple of years, then closed for refurbishment and will reopen in 2018.

Phoebe Daltrey later went on to star in CBBC's Top This as a presenter of the show.

Joe Bloodworth is now a Hypebeast/Fashion influencer posting fashion photos on his Instagram.

References

External links
 

2016 British television series debuts
2016 British television series endings
2010s British children's television series
BBC children's television shows
English-language television shows